The 1953–54 Kentucky Wildcats men's basketball team represented University of Kentucky. The head coach was Adolph Rupp. The team was a member of the Southeast Conference and played their home games at Memorial Coliseum. They were named national champions by the Helms Athletic Foundation.

Season summary
This team finished unbeaten a 25-0, and though it won the Southeastern Conference title and could have played in the NCAA tournament, it chose not to because star players Frank Ramsey, Cliff Hagan and Lou Tsioropoulos were ruled ineligible because they had already graduated. That rule has since been abolished, but it prevented the Wildcats from competing for the national championship.

Roster

Rankings

Postseason
The Wildcats were the top-ranked team in the nation with a record of 25–0. Despite the undefeated season, the Wildcats did not participate in any post-season tournament. Three players (Lou Tsioropoulos, Frank Ramsey, and Cliff Hagan) had technically graduated the year before (when Kentucky was banned from playing a competitive schedule due to the point-shaving scandal a few years earlier), so those players were ruled ineligible for the NCAA tournament. Despite the wishes of the players, coach Adolph Rupp ultimately decided his team wouldn't play.

Team players drafted into the NBA
No one from the Wildcats was selected in the 1954 NBA Draft, as Ramsey, Hagan, and Tsioropoulos had been drafted the previous year, and those teams held their rights.

References

Kentucky
Kentucky Wildcats men's basketball seasons
NCAA Division I men's basketball tournament championship seasons